Runaway Dog is the second album by Chicago rock band Retirement Party, released on May 15, 2020, through Counter Intuitive Records.

Critical reception

Exclaim!s Adam Feibel gave the album a positive review, saying it "leaps out of the speakers with booming, upbeat power-pop, and the band makes a way bigger racket than you'd ever expect a trio to be able to make.". The Chicago Tribune gave it a 4/4.

Track listing

PersonnelRetirement Party'
 Avery Springer – lead vocals and guitar
 James Ringness – drums
 Eddy Rodriguez – guitar/bass

References

Retirement Party albums
2020 albums
Counter Intuitive Records albums